Ali Sheikh Abdullahi is a Somali diplomat. He is the ambassador of Somalia to Pakistan, based at the Somali embassy in Islamabad.

References

Living people
Ambassadors of Somalia to Pakistan
Somalian diplomats
Year of birth missing (living people)